It is a 1966 West German film directed by Ulrich Schamoni and starring Sabine Sinjen and .

It was chosen as West Germany's official submission to the 38th Academy Awards for Best Foreign Language Film, but did not manage to receive a nomination. It was also entered into the 1966 Cannes Film Festival.

Plot
The film tells the story of a young couple, a real estate agent and an architectural draughtswoman, and the marriage crisis resulting from a concealed pregnancy and abortion.

Cast
 Sabine Sinjen as Hilke
  as Manfred
 Horst Manfred Adloff as Manfred's boss
 Bernhard Minetti as A customer
 Harry Gillmann as Hilke's father
 Inge Herbrecht as Hilke's mother
 Werner Schwier as Sport fisher
 Ulrike Ulrich as Hilke's Friend
 Tilla Durieux as Old woman from East Germany
 Marcel Marceau
Ernst Jacobi as the bookseller

References

External links

 Es at Filmportal.de

1966 films
1966 drama films
German drama films
West German films
1960s German-language films
German black-and-white films
Films directed by Ulrich Schamoni
1960s German films